Préfontaine station is a Montreal Metro station in the borough of Mercier–Hochelaga-Maisonneuve in Montreal, Quebec, Canada. It is operated by the Société de transport de Montréal (STM) and serves the Green Line. It is in the district of Hochelaga-Maisonneuve. It opened on June 6, 1976, as part of the extension of the Green Line to Honoré-Beaugrand station.

Overview
Designed by Henri Brillon, it is a normal side platform station, built partly in tunnel with a large open cut containing an entrance, the mezzanine and admitting natural light. A secondary entrance is located to the north of rue Hochelaga. 

In 2019, work began to install elevators at the station. On November 8, 2021, the station became accessible with the opening of three elevators, becoming the 18th accessible station in Montreal.

Origin of the name
The station is so named because it lies under the west side of parc Raymond-Préfontaine, close to rue Préfontaine. These were named for Raymond Préfontaine (1850–1905), mayor of the former city of Hochelaga, and subsequently mayor of Montreal (1898–1902).

Connecting bus routes

Nearby points of interest
 Centre hospitalier J-Henri-Charbonneau
 Centre commercial Maisonneuve
 Héma-Québec
 Parc et aréna Raymond-Préfontaine
 Teccart Institute
 Technopôle Angus
 Ligne Verte Tattoo

References

External links

 Préfontaine Station - official site
 Montreal by Metro, metrodemontreal.com - photos, information, and trivia
 2011 STM System Map
 Metro Map

Green Line (Montreal Metro)
Mercier–Hochelaga-Maisonneuve
Railway stations in Canada opened in 1976